Standings or rankings are listings which compare sports teams or individuals, institutions, nations, companies, or other entities by ranking them in order of ability or achievement. A table or chart (such as a league table, a ladder or a leaderboard) may be employed to display such listings. A league table may list several related statistics, but they are generally sorted by the primary one that determines the rankings. Many industries and institutions may compete in league tables in order to help bring in new customers and clients. Those tables ranking sports teams are generally used to help determine who may advance to the playoffs or another tournament, who is promoted or relegated, or who gets a higher draft pick.

Sport

In sport, league tables group teams of similar abilities in a chart to show the current standing of the participants (teams or individuals) in a sports league or competition. These lists are generally published in newspapers and other media, as well as the official web sites of the sports leagues and competitions.

The standings shows where each team ranks in their conference or division.  Teams may be ranked in terms of simple winning percentage (the proportion of the games played to date which the team won), or based on total points, with differing numbers of points awarded for wins and ties (draws).  Many league tables show further statistics and may display:
 wins
 losses
 ties (draws)
 goal differential (Goals scored minus goals conceded)
 goals scored
 goals allowed (conceded)
 home/away win–loss records

Usually, if a league is divided into conferences and divisions, the league table will also be. Often, a less specific table is also included. For example, National Hockey League tables will normally have a detailed table for each division, plus a table for each conference showing just the points totals.

As an example, below is the league table for the Northeast Division of the National Hockey League, as of March 31, 2004:
 Team         GP   W   L   T  OL   GF   GA  Pts
 x-Boston     79  40  18  14   7  201  179  101
 x-Toronto    80  43  24  10   3  234  204   99
 x-Ottawa     79  41  22  10   6  254  178   98
 x-Montreal   79  40  28   7   4  201  182   91
 Buffalo      79  36  32   7   4  213  210   83
 
 x - clinched a playoff spot
 y - clinched the division championship

In the above table, an "'X" placed before a team's name shows that the team has qualified for playoff position; other letters may be used to show that a team is guaranteed first place, has been eliminated from contention and so forth. From this table, we can see that Boston, Toronto, Ottawa and Montreal are all guaranteed playoff positions; the absence of a " y" shows that the division championship is still to play for. Meanwhile, because Buffalo has no symbol at all, they are not out of playoff contention, but have yet to clinch a playoff position. The following day, a new league table would appear in newspapers, updated based on the previous night's games. Of course, the above table would also be accompanied by those of the other divisions in the league.

Education
League tables are used to compare the academic achievements of different institutions. College and university rankings order institutions in higher education by combinations of factors. In addition to entire institutions, specific programs, departments, and schools are ranked. These rankings usually are conducted by magazines, newspapers, governments and academics. For example, league tables of British universities are published annually by The Guardian, The Independent, The Sunday Times and The Times. The primary aim of these rankings is to inform potential applicants about British universities based on a range of criteria. Similarly, in countries like India, league tables are being developed and a popular magazine, Education World, published them based on data from TheLearningPoint.net. 

It is complained that the ranking of England's schools to rigid guidelines that fail to take into account wider social conditions actually makes failing schools even worse. This is because the most involved parents will then avoid such schools, leaving only the children of non-ambitious parents to attend.

Business
In business, league tables list the leaders in investment banking activity, enabling people to quickly analyze financial data. Companies which collect this kind of data include Dealogic, Bloomberg L.P. and Thomson Reuters. The Thomson Reuters league tables list the top financiers in a particular industry. Dealogic's league tables are rankings of investment banks in terms of the dollar volume of deals that investment banks work on. Bloomberg's league tables provide an overview of top underwriters and legal advisers to securities deals, as well as fees netted from these transactions.

See also
 Games behind – in some sports, a common way to reflect the gap between teams
 Magic number – in some sports, the number of wins needed to clinch a championship

References

Further reading
 School league tables for the CISCE examining board in India

External links
  Australian Football League ladder
 Canadian Football League standings
 National Basketball Association standings
 National Hockey League standings
 National Football League standings
 Major League Baseball standings
 Major League Soccer standings
 Premier League tables

Sports terminology
Rankings